Ela Veezha Poonchira is an Indian Malayalam-language crime thriller film directed by Shahi Kabir, who is known for scripting Joseph and Nayattu. It stars Soubin Shahir, Sudhi Koppa, and Jude Anthany Joseph. The film was released on 15 July 2022. Ela Veezha Poonchira is the first ever Malayalam film to be released in Dolby Vision 4K HDR.

Plot 

Madhu, a Poonchira hilltop cop, is returning to duty. The hilltop is frequently struck by lightning, so police risk their lives to keep guests out. As Madhu returns to the station, he discovers Venkayam set to leave the next day to go home, while Sudhi, another cop on duty at the same site, is supposed to join.

After a storm, a family visits the location. One son returns to the car because he forgot something as the lady and two sons enter. The lady and one of her sons ask Madhu and Sudhi to invite them in to see where her husband worked. Madhu senses lightning and urges the mother and son to get inside the station for safety. As expected, a strong lightning strikes the station, and as the storm calms, the lady calls out to check on her second son. Madhu finds the youngster killed by lightning. The police and emergency personnel remove the body and restore order. Madhu is always frightened and serious during their stay at the station. The next day, Sudhi gets drunk with Madhu and shows his perversion by peeping into couples that come near the spot for privacy.

One of the top police officials isolates himself to take a call after a normal incident assessment. Sudhi flirts with the lady constable and tours the team. The highest official yells at the caller. The police jeep driver tells the official that his wife had an affair with another driver (police or not) and fled with him, now requesting for custody of their children. Another police radio crime alert sends the crew away.

Sudhi unintentionally chases the dogs away from the camp and finds them digging up a partially buried human hand. Madhu suddenly points a gun at him from behind. Sudhi acts casual as if he hadn't spotted the hand and Madhu cut him loose, fearing Madhu will murder him. Sudhi suspects Madhu has killed and buried a person.

Sudhi phones the central station to report Madhu for his offense. Madhu stops him from calling and invites him to talk. Sudhi drinks with Madhu. Madhu serves him chicken biryani while drinking.

While Sudhi eats the biryani, Madhu says the hand is from his wife's corpse but he didn't kill her. They were unhappily married. Doctors called Madhu's erectile difficulties "honeymoon sadness" after they married. After months of therapy, the condition persisted. Madhu realized his wife was having an affair, but he disregarded it because he couldn't be her husband. His wife committed suicide when he returned from duty. 'She was guilty and pregnant' was in her diary. She couldn't keep cheating him. She asks Madhu's pardon. Madhu rages and dismembers his wife.

Through Madhu's wife Amrutha's phone, police identify the body parts. They discover her affair with Sudhi. She tells Sudhi in whatsapp conversations that she is four months pregnant and cannot abort the child. Sudhi turns her no, citing "obligations" (his wall paper shows him with another woman).

Returning in the camp, Madhu rhetorically asks what happened to the baby in the wife's stomach in the story and unflinchingly says that he fed the fetus to the one responsible. After realizing he was Madhu's wife's lover, Sudhi vomits. Madhu kills Sudhi like lightning.

Madhu was leaving camp after his duty when the police arrived. He said Sudhi died from lightning. The police conclude as such, but the top official, who was experiencing family troubles, sees Madhu's shirt torn piece sticking to the fence near the body and suspects him. He ignores it because his wife had an affair and he understood the killing of Sudi.

Cast 

 Soubin Shahir as Madhu
 Sudhi Koppa as Sudhi
 Jude Anthany Joseph as Venkayam
 Jithu Ashraf as Inspector Jinto
 Vincent Vadakkan as SP
 Girish Mohan as Forensic expert
 Jineesh Chandran as The lover

Production 
The film is produced by Vishnu Venu under the banner Kadhaas Untold, and features real-life police officers from various quarters of police work. Sudhi Koppa and Jude Anthony Joseph are the other important characters in the film. The film is scripted by Nidhish G and Shaji Maarad. Manesh Madhavan,who earlier helmed the cinematography for Joseph, handled the cinematography. While Anil Johnson composed music for the film, Ajayan Adat designed the sounds. Kiran Das is the editor.

Shooting location 

The film is set in the secluded region of Ilaveezhapoonchira, a tourist destination located at an altitude of over 3000 feet above sea level. The place is located in Melukavu village in Kottayam district. Although the place is a tourist attraction, the chances of thunderstorms are very high.

Scripting 
After the announcement of the film, a Kerala Police officer who works in Ilaveezha Poonchira police station has written on Facebook about their alone hazardous job atmosphere in Ilaveezha Poonchira went viral. In his write up, he mentioned two police officers, Nidheesh and Shaji Maarad, who enjoy working there for years. These two police officers are the script writers of film.

Casting 
Soubin Shahir arrives in the main role as a policeman who is a security guard in the high range of Ilaveezhapoonchira and the story of the film is a murder and its investigation.

Release 
The  film was announced on 28 September 2021 through Kadhaas Untold's official Facebook page. The trailer of the film was released in YouTube on 26 June 2022. The film was released on 15 July 2022.

See also 

 Ilaveezha Poonchira (tourist place)

References

External links 

2020s Indian films
Indian crime thriller films